NVC community H1 (Calluna vulgaris - Festuca ovina heath) is one of the heath communities in the British National Vegetation Classification system. It is one of five communities categorised as lowland dry heaths. 

It is a fairly localised community. There are five subcommunities.

Community composition

The following constant species are found in this community:
 Heather (Calluna vulgaris)
 Sheep's Fescue (Festuca ovina)
 Broom Fork-moss Dicranum scoparium
 Cypress-leaved Plait-moss Hypnum cupressiforme sensu lato

No rare species are associated with the community.

Distribution

This community is confined to eastern and southeastern England, from Sussex to Lincolnshire, with the greatest concentrations occurring in Norfolk.

Subcommunities

There are five subcommunities:
 the Hypnum cupressiforme subcommunity
 the Hypogymnia physodes - Cladonia impexa subcommunity
 the Teucrium scorodonia subcommunity
 the Carex arenaria subcommunity
 the so-called species-poor subcommunity

References

 Rodwell, J. S. (1991) British Plant Communities Volume 2 - Mires and heaths  (hardback),  (paperback)

H01